Brian Simmons (born March 16, 1985) is a Canadian football offensive tackle for the Montreal Alouettes of the Canadian Football League (CFL). He was signed by the New England Patriots as an undrafted free agent in 2010. Following his release, he signed with the Hamilton Tiger-Cats on May 18, 2011. He played college football at Oklahoma.

References

Brian Simmons was born in Charlotte NC. He and his mother moved to Raleigh NC in 1987.

External links
Hamilton Tiger-Cats bio

1985 births
Living people
Canadian football offensive linemen
Montreal Alouettes players
Edmonton Elks players
Hamilton Tiger-Cats players
New England Patriots players
Oklahoma Sooners football players
Players of American football from Raleigh, North Carolina
Sportspeople from Raleigh, North Carolina
American football offensive linemen
American players of Canadian football